Yahir Reyes (born August 14, 1985) is a Mexican former professional mixed martial artist. A professional competitor from 2002 until 2010, he competed for Bellator.

Mixed martial arts record

|-
|Loss
|align=center|14-7
|Richard Schiller
|Submission (rear naked choke)
|MEZ Sports: Pandemonium 2
|
|align=center|3
|align=center|1:27
|Los Angeles, California, United States
|
|-
|Loss
|align=center|14-6
|Joe Soto
|Submission (rear naked choke)
|Bellator 10
|
|align=center|2
|align=center|4:11
|Ontario, California, United States
|Bellator Season One Featherweight Tournament Final; For Bellator Featherweight Championship.
|-
|Win
|align=center|14-5
|Estevan Payan
|KO (spinning back fist)
|Bellator 6
|
|align=center|2
|align=center|1:56
|Robstown, Texas, United States
|Bellator Season One Featherweight Tournament Semifinal.
|-
|Win
|align=center|13-5
|Nick Gonzalez
|Submission (rear-naked choke)
|Bellator 1
|
|align=center|1
|align=center|2:11
|Hollywood, Florida, United States
|Bellator Season One Featherweight Tournament Quarterfinal.
|-
|Win
|align=center|12-5
|Paris Ruiz
|KO (punches)
|COF 13: Aztec Alliance
|
|align=center|2
|align=center|4:22
|Tijuana, Mexico
|
|-
|Win
|align=center|11-5
|Fred Leavy
|Decision (split)
|MMA Xtreme 18
|
|align=center|3
|align=center|5:00
|Tijuana, Mexico
|
|-
|Win
|align=center|10-5
|Zus Gutierrez
|Submission (rear naked choke)
|MMA Xtreme 17
|
|align=center|1
|align=center|2:03
|Honduras
|
|-
|Win
|align=center|9-5
|Charles Williams
|Submission (triangle choke)
|MMA Xtreme 15
|
|align=center|1
|align=center|3:00
|Mexico City, Mexico
|
|-
|Loss
|align=center|8-5
|Jose Luis Cocafuego
|Submission (heel hook)
|MMA Xtreme 12
|
|align=center|1
|align=center|1:22
|Mexicali, Mexico
|
|-
|Win
|align=center|8-4
|Art Diaz
|Submission (armbar)
|MMA Xtreme 11
|
|align=center|1
|align=center|0:51
|Tijuana, Mexico
|
|-
|Win
|align=center|7-4
|Robbie Peralta
|Submission (rear naked choke)
|MMA Xtreme 9
|
|align=center|1
|align=center|N/A
|Tijuana, Mexico
|
|-
|Win
|align=center|6-4
|Benjamin la Cobra
|Submission (armbar)
|MMA Xtreme 8
|
|align=center|2
|align=center|N/A
|Santo Domingo, Dominican Republic
|
|-
|Win
|align=center|5-4
|Rick Screeton
|Submission (armbar)
|MMA Xtreme 7
|
|align=center|2
|align=center|0:13
|Tijuana, Mexico
|
|-
|Win
|align=center|4-4
|John Wallace
|KO (punches)
|MMA Xtreme 6
|
|align=center|2
|align=center|1:01
|Tijuana, Mexico
|
|-
|Loss
|align=center|3-4
|Landon Piercey
|TKO (corner stoppage)
|MMA Xtreme 3
|
|align=center|2
|align=center|5:00
|Tijuana, Mexico
|
|-
|Win
|align=center|3-3
|Issac Peralta
|TKO
|MMA Xtreme 1
|
|align=center|1
|align=center|N/A
|Tijuana, Mexico
|
|-
|Loss
|align=center|2-3
|Angelo Catsouras
|TKO (corner stoppage)
|Total Combat 12
|
|align=center|1
|align=center|5:00
|Tijuana, Mexico
|
|-
| NC
|align=center|2-2
|Rick Screeton
|No Contest
|Total Combat 9
|
|align=center|N/A
|align=center|N/A
|Tijuana, Mexico
|
|-
|Loss
|align=center|2-2
|Chris David
|TKO (punches)
|Total Combat 4
|
|align=center|1
|align=center|N/A
|Tijuana, Mexico
|
|-
|Win
|align=center|2-1
|Michael Chupa
|Decision (unanimous)
|Total Combat 2
|
|align=center|3
|align=center|3:00
|Tijuana, Mexico
|
|-
|Win
|align=center|1-1
|Angel Yocupicio
|Submission (armbar)
|Reto Maximo 2
|
|align=center|2
|align=center|3:19
|Tijuana, Mexico
|
|-
|Loss
|align=center|0-1
|Ivan Lopez
|Decision (unanimous)
|Reto Maximo 1
|
|align=center|2
|align=center|5:00
|Tijuana, Mexico
|

References

External links

Living people
1985 births
Mexican male mixed martial artists
Featherweight mixed martial artists
Sportspeople from Tijuana